Francis Kynaston (17 November 1516–4 August 1590) was an English politician.

He was second but eldest surviving son of George Kynaston of Oteley, Shropshire, and his wife Jane, daughter of Sir Edward Grey of Enville, Staffordshire. He succeeded to his father's estates in 1542 and married by 1568, Margaret, daughter of Francis Charlton of Apley Castle, Shropshire and widow of Arthur Chambers or Chambre (d.1564) of Petton, Shropshire. By her he had two sons and six daughters, but he also fathered an illegitimate son.

He was a Member (MP) of the Parliament of England for Shropshire in April 1554. He died in August 1590 aged 74 and was buried at Ellesmere, Shropshire.

References

1516 births
1590 deaths
English MPs 1554